The 2012 Stony Brook Seawolves baseball team represented Stony Brook University in the 2012 NCAA Division I baseball season. The Seawolves were coached by 22nd-year head coach Matt Senk and played their home games at Joe Nathan Field. The Seawolves clinched their second consecutive regular season championship and their fourth America East Conference baseball tournament championship, earning the league's automatic bid to the 2012 NCAA Division I baseball tournament, their fourth appearance in school history.

In the NCAA tournament, the team went on to win the Coral Gables Regional. They then defeated LSU in the Baton Rouge Super Regional, becoming the first ever team from the America East Conference to advance to the College World Series, the first team from New York in thirty years, and the first team from the Northeast since 1986.

Summary

Regular season 
Stony Brook opened their 2012 campaign with a perfect 4–0 weekend at Thibodaux, Louisiana, with pair of victories over Alabama State and Nicholls State in the Colonel Round Robin. The team then traveled to Greenville, North Carolina, to face off against East Carolina, where they were swept in three consecutive one-run games to drop their record to 4–3. They returned to the Northeast for a single game against Fairleigh Dickinson, routing the Knights at Teaneck, New Jersey. Stony Brook participated in the Dairy Queen Classic splitting the weekend against Kansas and host Minnesota, bringing their record to 7–5.

Stony Brook opened their home season on March 10 against Iona beating the Gaels 12–7. The Seawolves followed up beating the Yale Bulldogs three out of four in a weekend series and compiled a string of victories against Fordham and Columbia for their first five-win streak of the season. Stony Brook couldn't keep the pace and lost back-to-back games against Holy Cross but bounced back to win a pair of games against NYIT and victories against Marist and Fairleigh Dickinson, ending their non-conference slate at 17–8.

The Seawolves opened conference play against Binghamton, taking two of three at home. The team won two midweek non-conference games against Iona and Marist at home and then traveled to Albany for a weekend series; the Seawolves took three out of four. The team returned home to beat Rhode Island 8–2 and swept a four-game series against Hartford. Stony Brook played a pair of midweek non-conference games against Fairfield and Central Connecticut, coming out victorious on both occasions and swept a four-game series at UMBC, extending their winning streak to ten games and taking command of first place in the America East with a 34–10 overall record and 12–2 conference record.

Stony Brook took two out of three against Binghamton at home and swept a three-game series against UMBC to clinch a second consecutive regular season championship while going 21–2 at home. Stony Brook closed the regular season with a four-game sweep at conference rival Maine to win a program record 43 games. They ended the regular season with a 43–11 record, going 21–3 in the America East. The Seawolves headed into the conference tournament with the best winning percentage in Division I.

America East tournament 
Stony Brook earned a first-round bye in the America East tournament, hosted at Joe Nathan Field. Needing to win three games to earn the conference title, they defeated fourth-seeded Maine 14–6 and third-seeded Binghamton 7–4 to advance to the title game, where they met up with Maine again, defeating them 13–6 to advance to the 2012 NCAA Division I baseball tournament with a 46–11 record, the best record in Division I with an .807 winning percentage. The Seawolves were the first team in the America East since 2002 to earn both the regular season and conference tournament championships in the same season. For the first time in the history of the program, Stony Brook found itself ranked, sitting at #25 in the Baseball America poll and #29 in the NCBWA poll.

Coral Gables Regional 
Stony Brook traveled to South Florida to play in the Coral Gables Regional as the fourth seed. In the first game the Seawolves knocked off top seeded Miami (FL) by a score of 10–2. The Hurricanes had not lost a regional home opener since 1978. After losing to UCF 9–8, the Seawolves entered the loser's bracket, where they defeated Missouri State 10–7, mounting a comeback after being down four runs in the seventh inning and striking out Luke Voit with the bases loaded in the bottom of the ninth to preserve the victory. This gave the Seawolves a spot in the regional championship, where they defeated UCF 12–5 and 10–6 in consecutive days to win the regional, advancing to face LSU in the Super Regionals.

Baton Rouge Super Regional 
In the first game of the Baton Rouge Super Regional, LSU started freshman Aaron Nola while Stony Brook started sophomore Brandon McNitt. While Nola departed with a 2–0 deficit, the Tigers came back to tie in the bottom of the ninth on a solo shot by JaCoby Jones. Stony Brook put together leads in the top of the 10th and 11th innings, but LSU tied the game both times with solo home runs. A rain delay in the 12th inning postponed the game, set to restart at 10:05 a.m. on the next day. A single by Mason Katz in the bottom of the 12th gave LSU a 5–4 walk-off victory.

In game two of the Super Regional, LSU started Kevin Gausman, who had been drafted in the top 5 of the 2012 MLB Draft a week prior. Gausman had closed out game one earlier in the day. Stony Brook's senior pitcher Tyler Johnson threw a 127-pitch complete game as the Seawolves defeated the Tigers 3–1. In the winner-take-all game three, Stony Brook jumped out to an early lead and handily won 7–2 behind sophomore pitcher Frankie Vanderka's complete game. The improbable upset sent Stony Brook to the College World Series, the first Northeast school to do so since 1986 and the first school from New York to do so since St. John's in 1980.

College World Series 
After upsetting LSU in Baton Rouge, Stony Brook took on the motto "Shock The World" to represent their unlikely run to the College World Series. Stony Brook found itself ranked #7 in NCBWA poll, their highest ranking ever, and Matt Senk was later announced to be the National Coach of Year. In the College World Series, Stony Brook suffered consecutive losses, falling 9–1 to UCLA and 12–2 to Florida State to end the Seawolves' Cinderella run. They finished the season 52–15, the most wins by any Division I team in 2012, with a program record seven drafted players.

Roster

Schedule

! style=""|Regular Season  (43–11)
|- valign="top"

|- align="center" bgcolor="#D8FFEB"
| 1|| February 24 || || Alabama State (Colonel Round Robin)|| Ray E. Didier Field || W 3–2 || Vanderka (1–0) || Estevez (0–1) || None || 300 || 1–0 || –
|- align="center" bgcolor="#D8FFEB"
| 2|| February 24 || || Nicholls State  (Colonel Round Robin) || Ray E. Didier Field || W 8–6 || McNitt (1–0) || Webster (1–1) || Rakkar (1) || 400 || 2–0 || –
|- align="center" bgcolor="#D8FFEB"
| 3|| February 25 || || Alabama State  (Colonel Round Robin) || Ray E. Didier Field|| W 6–0 || Stecko (1–0) || Frost (0–2) || None || 200 || 3–0 || –
|- align="center" bgcolor="#D8FFEB"
| 4|| February 26 || || Nicholls State  (Colonel Round Robin) || Ray E. Didier Field || W 4–1 || Campbell (1–0) || Wisecarver (0–1) || Vanderka (1) || 307 || 4–0 || –
|-

|- align="center" bgcolor="#FFE6E6"
| 5|| March 2 || || East Carolina || Clark–LeClair Stadium || L 0–1 || Brandt (2–1) || Johnson (0–1) || Reynolds (4) || 2262 || 4–1 || –
|- align="center" bgcolor="#FFE6E6"
| 6|| March 3 || || East Carolina || Clark–LeClair Stadium || L 1–2 || Merritt (1–1) || McNitt (1–1) || Reynolds (5) || 2123 || 4–2 || –
|- align="center" bgcolor="#FFE6E6"
| 7|| March 4 || || East Carolina || Clark–LeClair Stadium || L 3–4 || Cotton (2–0) || Stecko-Haley (1–1) || Merritt (1) || 2138 || 4–3 || –
|- align="center"  bgcolor="#D8FFEB"
| 8|| March 7 || || Fairleigh Dickinson|| Naimoli Family Baseball Complex || W 17–5 || Gallup (1–0) || Paz (0–1) || None || 139 || 5–3 || –
|- align="center"  bgcolor="#D8FFEB"
| 9|| March 9 || || Kansas  (Dairy Queen Classic)|| H.H.H. Metrodome || W 4–0 || Johnson (1–1) || Taylor (1–2) || None || N/A || 6–3 || –
|- align="center" bgcolor="#FFE6E6"
| 10|| March 9 || || Kansas  (Dairy Queen Classic)|| H.H.H. Metrodome || L 1–3 || Kahana(2–0) || Rakkar (0–1) || None || 110 || 6–4 || –
|- align="center" bgcolor="#FFE6E6"
| 11|| March 10 || || Minnesota  (Dairy Queen Classic)|| H.H.H. Metrodome|| L 1–7 || Oakes (4–0) || Stecko-Haley (1–2) || None || N/A || 6–5 || –
|- align="center" bgcolor="#D8FFEB"
| 12|| March 11 || || Minnesota  (Dairy Queen Classic)|| H.H.H. Metrodome || W 5–4 || Rakkar (1–1) || Kray (0–1) || Carmona (1) || 250 || 7–5 || –
|- align="center" bgcolor="#D8FFEB"
| 13|| March 14 || || Iona || Joe Nathan Field || W 12–7 || Brass (1–0) || Leon (0–1) || None || 225 || 8–5 || –
|- align="center" bgcolor="#D8FFEB"
| 14|| March 17 || || Yale || Yale Field|| W 2–1 (F/11) || Mason (1–0)  || Fortunato (0–1) || None || 225 || 9–5 || –
|- align="center" bgcolor="#FFE6E6"
| 15|| March 17 || || Yale || Yale Field || L 0–1 || Shultz (1–0) || Vanderka (1–1) || None || 225 || 9–6 || –
|- align="center" bgcolor="#D8FFEB"
| 16|| March 18 || || Yale || Yale Field || W 13–2 || Stecko-Haley (2–2) || Becker (0–2) || None || – || 10–6 || –
|- align="center" bgcolor="#D8FFEB"
| 17|| March 18 || || Yale || Yale Field || W 10–0 || Rakkar (2–1) || Hickey (1–2) || None || 245 || 11–6 || –
|- align="center" bgcolor="#D8FFEB"
| 18|| March 20 || || Fordham || Houlihan Park || W 11–2 || Gallup (2–0) || Reich (0–2) || None ||  189 || 12–6 || –
|- align="center" bgcolor="#D8FFEB"
| 19|| March 23 || || Columbia || Robertson Field || W 6–5 || McNitt (2–1) || Olson (1–3) || Mason (1) || – || 13–6 || –
|- align="center" bgcolor="#D8FFEB"
| 20|| March 23 || || Columbia || Robertson Field || W 11–10 || Mason (2–0) || Spinosa (0–4) || Rakkar (2) || 231 || 14–6 || –
|- align="center" bgcolor="#FFE6E6"
| 21|| March 25 || || Holy Cross ||Fitton Field || L 1–3 || Marra (2–1) || Vanderka (1–2) || None || 125 || 14–7 || –
|- align="center" bgcolor="#FFE6E6"
| 22|| March 25 || || Holy Cross || Fitton Field|| L 3–5 || Colella (3–1) || Rakkar (2–2) || None || 102 || 14–8 || –
|-

|- align="center" bgcolor="#D8FFEB"
| 23|| April 1 || || NYIT || Joe Nathan Field || W 6–0 || Johnson (2–1)  || Dillabough (0–3) || None || – || 15–8 || –
|- align="center" bgcolor="#D8FFEB"
| 24|| April 1 || || NYIT || Joe Nathan Field || W 10–1 || Stecko-Haley (3–2)  || Bulva (0–2) || None || 225 || 16–8 || –
|- align="center" bgcolor="#D8FFEB"
| 25|| April 4 || || Fairleigh Dickinson || Joe Nathan Field || W 9–0 || Tatelman (1–0) || MacDonald (0–1) || None || 125 || 17–8 || –
|- align="center" bgcolor="#D8FFEB"
| 26|| April 6 || || Binghamton || Joe Nathan Field || W 2–1 (F/8) || Johnson (3–1) || Augliera (2–4) || None || – || 18–8 || 1–0
|- align="center" bgcolor="#D8FFEB"
| 27|| April 6 || || Binghamton|| Joe Nathan Field || W 9–2 || McNitt (3–1) || Lynch (2–3) || Vanderka (2) || 310 || 19–8 || 2–0
|- align="center" bgcolor="#FFE6E6"
| 28|| April 7 || || Binghamton || Joe Nathan Field || L 2–5 || Lambert (2–3) || Stecko-Haley (3–3) || Sosa (3) || 205 || 19–9 || 2–1
|- align="center" bgcolor="#D8FFEB"
| 29|| April 10 || || Iona || Joe Nathan Field || W 10–3 || Rakkar (3–2)  || Nargoski (2–4) || None || 175 || 20–9 || –
|- align="center" bgcolor="#D8FFEB"
| 30|| April 11 || || Marist || Joe Nathan Field || W 14–5|| Gallup (3–0)  || Zlotnick (0–2) || None || 115 || 21–9 || –
|- align="center" bgcolor="#D8FFEB"
| 31|| April 14 || || Albany || Varsity Field || W 9–2 || Johnson (4–1)  || Graham || None || 143 || 22–9 || 3–1
|- align="center" bgcolor="#D8FFEB"
| 32|| April 14 || || Albany || Varsity Field  || W 13–3|| McNitt (4–1) || Lucas || None || 66 ||  23–9|| 4–1
|- align="center" bgcolor="#D8FFEB"
| 33|| April 15 || || Albany || Varsity Field  || W 6–4|| Campbell (2–0)  || Kraham || Mason (2) || 173|| 24–9 || 5–1
|- align="center" bgcolor="#FFE6E6"
| 34 || April 16 || || Albany || Varsity Field ||L 6–7 (F/10) || ||  ||  ||  || 24–10 || 5–2
|- align="center" bgcolor="#D8FFEB"
| 35 || April 18 || || Rhode Island || Joe Nathan Field  ||W 8–2|| Yerry (1–0) ||  ||  ||  || 25–10 || –
|- align="center" bgcolor="#D8FFEB"
| 36 || April 20 || || Hartford|| Joe Nathan Field ||W 7–5||   ||  ||   || || 26–10 || 6–2
|- align="center" bgcolor="#D8FFEB"
| 37 || April 20 || || Hartford || Joe Nathan Field ||W 6–0||   ||  ||   || || 27–10 || 7–2
|- align="center" bgcolor="#D8FFEB"
| 38 || April 21 || || Hartford || Joe Nathan Field ||W 4–0||   ||  ||   || || 28–10 || 8–2
|- align="center" bgcolor="#D8FFEB"
| 39 || April 21 || || Hartford || Joe Nathan Field ||W 9–4||   ||  ||   || || 29–10 || 9–2
|- align="center" bgcolor="#D8FFEB"
| 40 || April 24 || || Central Connecticut || Joe Nathan Field ||W 4–3||   ||  ||   || || 30–10 || –
|- align="center" bgcolor="#D8FFEB"
| 41 || April 25 || || Fairfeld || Alumni Baseball Diamond||W 6–4||   ||  ||   || || 31–10 || –
|- align="center" bgcolor="#D8FFEB"
| 42 || April 28 || || UMBC || The Baseball Factory Field at UMBC||W 5–0||   ||  ||   || || 32–10 || 10–2
|- align="center" bgcolor="#D8FFEB"
| 43 || April 28 || || UMBC || The Baseball Factory Field at UMBC||W 13–6||   ||  ||   || || 33–10 || 11–2
|- align="center" bgcolor="#D8FFEB"
| 44 || April 29 || || UMBC || The Baseball Factory Field at UMBC||W 17–1||   ||  ||   || || 34–10 || 12–2
|-

|- align="center" bgcolor="#D8FFEB"
| 45 || May 5 || || Binghamton || Joe Nathan Field ||W 3–0||   ||  ||   || || 35–10 || 13–2
|- align="center" bgcolor="#FFE6E6"
| 46 || May 5 || || Binghamton || Joe Nathan Field ||L 1–3||   ||  ||   || || 35–11 || 13–3
|- align="center" bgcolor="#D8FFEB"
| 47 || May 6 || || Binghamton || Joe Nathan Field ||W 8–0||   ||  ||   || || 36–11 || 14–3
|- align="center" bgcolor="#D8FFEB"
| 48 || May 12 || || UMBC || Joe Nathan Field ||W 6–5||   ||  ||   || || 37–11 || 15–3
|- align="center" bgcolor="#D8FFEB"
| 49 || May 12 || || UMBC || Joe Nathan Field ||W 21–8||   ||  ||   || || 38–11 || 16–3
|- align="center" bgcolor="#D8FFEB"
| 50 || May 13 || || UMBC || Joe Nathan Field ||W 7–6||   ||  ||   || || 39–11 || 17–3
|- align="center" bgcolor="#D8FFEB"
| 51 || May 18 || || Maine || Mahaney Diamond ||W 5–1||   ||  ||   || || 40–11 || 18–3
|- align="center" bgcolor="#D8FFEB"
| 52 || May 18 || || Maine || Mahaney Diamond ||W 5–4||   ||  ||   || || 41–11 || 19–3
|- align="center" bgcolor="#D8FFEB"
| 53 || May 19 || || Maine || Mahaney Diamond ||W 7–2||   ||  ||   || || 42–11 || 20–3
|- align="center" bgcolor="#D8FFEB"
| 54 || May 19 || || Maine || Mahaney Diamond ||W 10–9||   ||  ||   || || 43–11 || 21–3
|-

|-
! style="" | Postseason (9–4)
|- 

|- align="center" bgcolor="#D8FFEB"
| 55 || May 23 || (1) || (4) Maine || Joe Nathan Field ||W 14–6||   ||  ||   || || 44–11 || 1–0
|- align="center" bgcolor="#D8FFEB"
| 56 || May 24 || (1) || (3) Binghamton || Joe Nathan Field ||W 7–4||   ||  ||   || || 45–11 || 2–0
|- align="center" bgcolor="#D8FFEB"
| 57 || May 25 || (1) || (4) Maine || Joe Nathan Field ||W 13–6||   ||  ||   || || 46–11 || 3–0
|-

|- align="center" bgcolor="#D8FFEB"
| 58 || June 1 || (4) || (1) No. 22 Miami (FL) || Alex Rodriguez Park ||W 10–2|| Johnson (10–1) || Erickson (8–6)  ||   || 1,247 || 47–11 || 1–0
|- align="center" bgcolor="#FFE6E6"
| 59 || June 2 || (4) || (2) No. 21 UCF || Alex Rodriguez Park ||L 8–9|| Matulis (7–0) || McNitt (8–3)  || Rogers (13) || 1,275 || 47–12 || 1–1
|- align="center" bgcolor="#D8FFEB"
| 60 || June 3 || (4) || (3) Missouri State || Alex Rodriguez Park ||W 10–7|| Vanderka (2–2)  || Burgess (5–2)  || Campbell ||  || 48–12 || 2–1
|- align="center" bgcolor="#D8FFEB"
| 61 || June 3 || (4) || (2) No. 21 UCF || Alex Rodriguez Park ||W 12–5|| Rakkar (6–2) || Skoglund (5–3) || Mason (3) || 926 || 49–12 || 3–1
|- align="center" bgcolor="#D8FFEB"
| 62 || June 4 || (4) || (2) No. 21 UCF || Alex Rodriguez Park ||W 10–6|| Johnson (11–1) || Adkins (3–6)  ||   || 710 || 50–12 || 4–1
|-

|- align="center" bgcolor="#FFE6E6"
| 63 || June 8–9 || No. 16 || (7) No. 1 LSU || Alex Box Stadium ||L 4–5(F/12) || Gausman (12–1) || Vanderka (2–3)  ||   || 11,207 || 50–13 || 4–2
|- align="center" bgcolor="#D8FFEB"
| 64 || June 9 || No. 16 || (7) No. 1 LSU || Alex Box Stadium||W 3–1|| Johnson (12–1) || Gausman (12–2) ||   || 11,468 || 51–13 || 5–2
|- align="center" bgcolor="#D8FFEB"
| 65 || June 10 || No. 16 || (7) No. 1 LSU || Alex Box Stadium||W 7–2|| Vanderka (3–3) || Eades (5–3)  ||   || 11,976 || 52–13 || 6–2
|-

|- align="center" bgcolor="#FFE6E6"
| 66 || June 15 || No. 7 || (2) No. 4 UCLA || TD Ameritrade Park||L 1–9|| Plutko (12–3) || Johnson (12–2) ||   || 21,662 || 52–14 || 0–1
|- align="center" bgcolor="#FFE6E6"
| 67 || June 17 || No. 7 || (3) No. 3 Florida State || TD Ameritrade Park||L 2–12|| Compton (12–2) || McNitt (8–4) ||   || 22,112 || 52–15 || 0–2
|-

Professional draftees

Stony Brook had a program-record seven players drafted by Major League Baseball teams in the First-Year Player Draft. Travis Jankowski was selected in the supplemental first round, 44th overall by San Diego, Stony Brook's first ever first-round draftee. Pat Cantwell, who was drafted previously in 2011, was drafted in the third round by the Texas Rangers. Maxx Tissenbaum (11th Round, San Diego), William Carmona (11th Round, Philadelphia), James Campbell (12th Round, Los Angeles Dodgers), Jasvir Rakkar (26th Round, Chicago), and Tyler Johnson (33rd Round, Oakland) were also drafted and all signed professional contracts with their respective teams.

Rankings

There are no Baseball America or Coaches' Polls for weeks 15 and 16, during the NCAA Tournament.

See also 

 Cinderella (sports)

References

Stony Brook Seawolves baseball seasons
Stony Brook Seawolves
College World Series seasons
America East Conference baseball champion seasons
Stony Brook
Stony